Than Than Htwe is a retired footballer from Myanmar who played for the Myanmar women's national football team as a midfielder.  She played for the Myanmar women's national football team for about 15 years and retired in 2015 due to her age and injury.  She was well known for her accurate long shots.  She scored her last goal for Myanmar women's national football team in the match against Chinese Taipei women's national football team on 22 September 2015 in the 2015–16 AFC Women's Olympic Qualifying Tournament.  Than Than Htwe along with a Myanmar footballer Kyaw Ko Ko are part of the ‘Protect the Goal’ for Myanmar athletes to raise awareness in Burma on HIV/AIDS and prevention.

International goals

References

External links 
 

1986 births
Living people
Burmese women's footballers
Myanmar women's international footballers
People from Ayeyarwady Region
Women's association football midfielders
Southeast Asian Games bronze medalists for Myanmar
Southeast Asian Games medalists in football
Competitors at the 2003 Southeast Asian Games
Competitors at the 2017 Southeast Asian Games